Abkhazian Che (Ҽ ҽ; italics: Ҽ ҽ) is a letter of the Cyrillic script.

Abkhazian Che is used in the alphabet of the Abkhaz language, where it represents the voiceless retroflex affricate .
The letter only coincidentally resembles a lowercase Latin letter 'e'. Historically, it's the cursive form of the corresponding letter in the Abkhazian Latin alphabet, where it somewhat resembled a Greek φ.

Computing codes

See also
Cyrillic characters in Unicode
Abkhazian Che with descender

References

Further reading
Daniels, Peter D. The World's Writing Systems. Oxford University Press, 1996.